The 2019 UNAF U-18 Tournament is an international football tournament hosted by Egypt from 4 to 14 April 2019.

Teams
Sources:.

Algeria
Coach:  Ludovic Batelli

Egypt

Kenya

Morocco

Tanzania

References

Squads